The Advocate is a student newspaper published at Contra Costa College, a community college in San Pablo, California. The paper is published weekly during the school year and has a circulation of approximately 2,500. An online edition, "cccadvocate," is also published. The current editor in chief is Alyssa Earnest, a former De Anza High School student.

Tradition of excellence 
The Advocate is one of the most decorated two-year college newspapers in the United States, having won 14 Associated Collegiate Press National Pacemaker Awards since 1990. The newspaper was inducted into the ACP Hall of Fame in 1996, and has been cited by ACP officials as being one of the best examples of small-college journalism.

Advocate reporters and photographers cover the campus, which rests halfway in San Pablo and halfway in Richmond in the East Bay Area. The students cover topics ranging from crime on campus, to student profiles, sports and local entertainment. The tradition of The Advocate has always been to chase news stories and focus on the hard news.

Awards 
 Associated Collegiate Press National Newspaper Pacemaker Award - 1990, 1994, 1997, 1998, 1999, 2000, 2001, 2002, 2004, 2005, 2006, 2008, 2009, 2011
 Associated Collegiate Press Best of Show
 College Media Association (Pinnacle Award Best Two-Year Newspaper) - 2017, 2018
 College Media Association (Pinnacle Award Best Two-Year Media Outlet) - 2018
 Associated Collegiate Press Hall Of Fame Members Since 1996

References

External links
 The Advocate - official Web site

Newspapers published in the San Francisco Bay Area
Student newspapers published in California
Weekly newspapers published in California